Drama is a 2022 Indian Tamil-language drama film directed by Aju Kizhumala and starring Kishore. It was released on 23 September 2022.

Cast
Kishore as Arjun
Charle as Murthy
Jai Bala  as Uday
Kavya Bellu as Vaigaa
Nakulan Vincent as Rajapandian

Production
Prior to release, the film garnered attention for being the "longest one-shot film in India". In late 2020, the entire film was shot in about 8 hours with 80 technicians on the set. Prior to the shoot, the cast members rehearsed for up to 180 days. Soon after its shoot, the makers marketed it as "the first movie in the Indian film industry to be entirely completed in a single shot", but later backtracked after the theatrical release of R. Parthiban's Iravin Nizhal (2022), another single shot film.

The film's director, Aju Kizhamala, revealed that he had rejected advances from OTT service providers in late 2020 to ensure the film had a theatrical release.

Reception
The film was released on 23 September 2022 across Tamil Nadu. A critic from Maalai Malar gave the film a mixed review, noting that it "lacked excitement". Film critic Malini Mannath gave the film a positive review, writing "it’s appreciable that the director has managed to confine his story telling to less than two hours of viewing time. ‘Drama’ is at its best a promising piece of work from a new entrant to the Tamil screen".

References

External links

2022 films
2020s Tamil-language films